James Whelan (24 December 1871 – 30 June 1949) was an Australian rules footballer who played with Fitzroy in the Victorian Football League.

References

External links

1871 births
1949 deaths
Fitzroy Football Club players
Australian rules footballers from Melbourne
People from Sunbury, Victoria